Maron is an American sitcom created by and starring Marc Maron as a fictionalized version of himself. The series premiered on the American cable television network IFC on May 3, 2013. Maron, Denis Leary, Jim Serpico, Olivia Wingate, Sivert Glarum, Michael Jamin and Duncan Birmingham served as the show's executive producers. Glarum and Jamin were the showrunners. Marons second season premiered on May 8, 2014, and its thirteen-episode third season premiered on May 14, 2015. In November 2015, the series was renewed for a thirteen-episode fourth season. In 2016 the show was nominated for the Writers Guild of America Award for Television: Episodic Comedy. On July 11, 2016, Maron announced on his WTF podcast that the series would not have a fifth season, with the season four finale serving as the series finale. The series finale aired on July 13, 2016.

Cast and characters
 Marc Maron as a fictionalized version of himself

Supporting
 Josh Brener as Kyle, Marc's assistant
 Dave Anthony as himself, Marc's pathetic friend
 Andy Kindler as himself, Marc's other pathetic friend
 Lucy Davis as Emily, Marc's manager
 Nora Zehetner as Jen, Marc's girlfriend
 Sally Kellerman as Toni Maron, Marc's mother
 Judd Hirsch as Larry Maron, Marc's father
 Troy Ruptash as Josh Maron, Marc's brother
 Rick Shapiro as Bernie, Marc's eccentric neighbor

Guest

 Steve Agee as Himself
 Maria Bamford as Herself
 Nate Bargatze
 Peter Berman
 Phil "CM Punk" Brooks as Himself
 Bruce Bruce as Himself
 Bill Burr as Himself
 Louis C.K. as Himself
 Colt Cabana as Himself
 Wyatt Cenac as Himself
 Carly Chaikin as Tina
 David Cross as Himself
 Whitney Cummings as Herself
 Erin Daniels as Female Vet
 Dov Davidoff as Himself
 Lucy Davis as Emily
 Joey Diaz as Bobby Mendez
 Andy Dick as Himself
 Illeana Douglas as Herself
 Mark Duplass as Himself
 Dave Foley as Himself
 M. C. Gainey
 Jeff Garlin
 Ralph Garman as Pete (voice)
 Gina Gershon as Alexa
 Adam Goldberg as Jack Ross
 Bobcat Goldthwait as Himself
 Dana Gould
 Elliott Gould as Himself
 Chris Hardwick as Himself
 Rachael Harris as Herself
 Phil Hendrie as Himself
 Pete Holmes as Himself
 Ken Jeong as Himself
 Anthony Jeselnik as Himself
 Jackie Kashian
 Louise Kelly
 Robert Kelly as Repairman #3
 Johnny Knoxville as Himself
 David Koechner as Himself
 Jerry Lambert
 Ted Lange as Wise Stranger
 Denis Leary as Himself
 Drew Lynch as Adam
 Ken Marino as Himself
 Maribeth Monroe
 Seth Morris as Jeremy
 Tig Notaro as Sydney
 Conan O'Brien as Himself
 Patton Oswalt as Himself
 Brian Palermo
 Jimmy Pardo as Himself
 Eddie Pepitone as Stu Carbone
 Ron Perlman as Mel
 Drew Pinsky as Himself
 Aubrey Plaza as Herself
 Mary Lynn Rajskub as Herself
 Caroline Rhea as Herself
 Andy Richter as Himself
 Rob Riggle
 Ray Romano
 Adam Scott as Himself
 Sam Seder
 Sarah Silverman as Herself
 Ryan Singer as Himself
 Bobby Slayton as Himself
 Amy Smart
 Jerry Stahl as Himself
 Fred Stoller as Himself
 Eric Stoltz as Danny
 Sally Struthers as Shirley
 Danny Trejo as Manny
 Derek Waters
 Constance Zimmer as Lindsey

Episodes

References

External links
 

2010s American single-camera sitcoms
2013 American television series debuts
2016 American television series endings
English-language television shows
IFC (American TV channel) original programming
Television series by 20th Century Fox Television
Television shows set in Los Angeles